This is a disambiguation page. 

 For the Five Great Zen Temples in Kamakura and Kyoto, see Five Mountain System. The same relates to the Japanese Zen temple ranking system.
 For the Five Mountains literature, see Japanese Literature of the Five Mountains.
 For the Five Mountain Peaks in Chinese culture, see Sacred Mountains of China.
 For the Five Mountain Peaks in Korean culture, see Five Mountains of Korea.